Amalgam is a suburb of Johannesburg, South Africa. It is located in Region B.

References

Johannesburg Region B